Thornton-Cleveleys is a conurbation consisting of the village of Thornton and the town of Cleveleys. The two settlements formed a joint urban district from 1927 until 1974, before becoming part of Wyre. The two settlements constitute part of the Blackpool Urban Area.

Political geography
The civil parish of Thornton became an urban district in 1900, and was then renamed Thornton-Cleveleys in 1927. On 1 April 1974 the urban district became part of the Borough of Wyre. Thornton-Cleveleys corresponds with five wards of the borough.

According to the 2001 census Thornton-Cleveleys has a population of 25,547, increasing to 28,703 at the 2011 census. The population of the individual borough council wards was recorded as:
Bourne: 6,121 (2011 = 6,676)
Cleveleys Park: 5,994 (2011 = 5,940)
Jubilee: 4,186 (2011 = 4,025)
Stanah: 5,267 (2011 = 6,111)
Victoria: 5,851 (2011 = 5,951)

History
Thornton is first mentioned in 1086 in the Domesday Book, where it was referred to as Torentum (a name preserved by Torentum Court on Lawsons Road). At the time it covered a large area including what are now Cleveleys and Fleetwood, and had a very low population density. It is thought that a settlement had existed at the site since the Iron Age, and a Roman road passes close to the village. The area remained lightly populated until 1799, when the marshland around the village was drained and agricultural production began on a large scale.

A railway station was opened in Thornton in 1865. The opening of salt works at nearby Burn Naze by the United Alkali Company in the early 1890s (later becoming ICI) led to significant expansion of the village, with new houses and community buildings constructed. Thornton became an urban district council in 1900, surviving until 1974 when it became part of the Wyre Borough Council.

Transport
Thornton for Cleveleys railway station was formerly the principal intermediate stop on the Fleetwood branch of the LMS/British Rail London Midland Region railway, running from Poulton-le-Fylde, but it has been years since the station was used, and with the recent fencing-over of the level crossing in Station Road/Victoria Road East in order to prevent youths from congregating on the tracks, the glory days of Thornton are long since gone. However, a decision by an action group based in Poulton means they will finance a feasibility study into bringing the railway back to Thornton and Fleetwood.

Amenities
Marsh Mill, a large, well-preserved windmill built in 1794, is a prominent landmark. It was commissioned by Bold Hesketh, uncle of Peter Hesketh (later Peter Hesketh-Fleetwood), who would go on to play a prominent role in the expansion of Fleetwood. Tragedy struck in May 1930, when a Miss Alice Baldwin and a Mrs Mary Jane Bailey visited the windmill with an interest in purchasing it. However, when both women stepped onto the fantail platform, the platform collapsed and the women fell to their deaths.

Thornton contains a number of schools, including Baines Endowed Primary School, Thornton Primary School, Stanah Primary School, Royles Brook Primary School and Millfield Science and Performing Arts College. The public library, situated at Four Lane Ends, was closed down in the autumn of 2016 as a result of cost-cutting measures by Lancashire County Council. This decisions was hugely unpopular and despite protests and a petition, the decision to close the library wasn't initially overturned, but the library reopened in February 2018 after the decision was reversed.

Sport
Thornton-Cleveleys is home to Thornton-Cleveleys R.U.F.C. who play rugby in the RFU Northern Division, North Lancs 1. Their home ground is the YMCA sport centre in Thornton.

Thornton-Cleveleys F.C. play in the West Lancashire Football League, they play their home matches at New Bourne Park.

The town boasts two cricket clubs - Thornton-Cleveleys C.C. and Norcross C.C. both playing in the Moore & Smalley Palace Shield competition and both having three senior sides and several junior teams in a variety of age groups.

Thornton Judo Club was established in 1974, formerly at The Sports centre and now at the Scout Hall on Marsh Road. It is a Member club of The British Judo Council and The British Judo Association.

Gallery

See also

Listed buildings in Thornton-Cleveleys

References

External links
Visit Cleveleys - all about the Thornton Cleveleys area

Unparished areas in Lancashire
Geography of the Borough of Wyre
The Fylde